is a passenger railway station on the Tōbu Urban Park Line in Ōmiya-ku, Saitama, Saitama Prefecture, Japan, operated by the private railway operator Tōbu Railway.

Lines

Station layout
The station consists of an elevated island platform serving two tracks, with the station building located underneath.

Platforms

Adjacent stations

History
The station opened on 12 April 1930.

From 17 March 2012, station numbering was introduced on all Tōbu lines, with Kita-omiya Station becoming "TD-02".

Passenger statistics
In fiscal 2019, the station was used by an average of 6321 passengers daily.

Surrounding area
Hikawa Shrine
Ōmiya Park
Ōmiya Post Office

See also
 List of railway stations in Japan

References

External links

  

Railway stations in Japan opened in 1930
Railway stations in Saitama (city)
Tobu Noda Line
Stations of Tobu Railway